Scottow is a village and civil parish in the English county of Norfolk.  It is located some 2.5 miles north of Coltishall and 5 miles south of North Walsham.

The villages name means 'Scots' hill-spur'.

For the purposes of local government, the parish falls within the district of North Norfolk.

Most of the former Royal Air Force Coltishall military airbase lay within the parish boundaries of Scottow.  Today, part of the RAF base has been converted into HMP Bure, a prison for adult males, and the rest has been used to create Scottow Enterprise Park focused on helping businesses to grow through providing space in the form of offices and workshops, as well as business support.

Governance
An electoral ward of the same name exists. This ward stretches east with a total population of 2,934 at the 2011 Census.

Notes

http://kepn.nottingham.ac.uk/map/place/Norfolk/Scottow

External links

Villages in Norfolk
Civil parishes in Norfolk
North Norfolk